Phantom cats, also known as Alien Big Cats (ABCs), are large felids such as leopards, jaguars and cougars which allegedly appear in regions outside their indigenous range. Sightings, tracks and predation have been reported in a number of countries and states including Australia, Canada, China, Denmark, Finland, France, Germany, Great Britain, Hawaii, Ireland, India, Italy, Luxembourg, Netherlands, New Zealand, Spain, Switzerland, and the United States.

Australia

Sightings of exotic big cats in Australia began more than 100 years ago. The New South Wales State Government reported in 2003 that "more likely than not" there was a number of exotic big cats living deep in the bushlands near Sydney.

Blue Mountains Panther

The Blue Mountains Panther is a phantom cat reported in sightings in the Blue Mountains area, west of Sydney for over a century. Speculation about the Blue Mountains Panther includes the theory that it descended from either circus or zoo escapees, or is a descendant of a military mascot.

Video footage showing a large black cat near Lithgow was examined by a group of seven zoo, museum, parks and agriculture staff, who concluded that it was a large domestic cat (2–3 times normal size) based partly on its morphology and partly on the behaviour of a nearby normal-sized domestic cat.

Gippsland phantom cat
In the Gippsland region of southeastern Victoria, American World War II airmen brought cougars with them as mascots and allegedly released them in the Australian bush.

Grampians puma
A study by Deakin University concluded that the existence of big cats in the Grampian Mountains area could not be definitively demonstrated based on available evidence. The evidence was strong enough however, for the author to believe the probability of big cats in the area is “beyond reasonable doubt".

Sunshine Coast big cats
There have been some claims that "Big Cats" have stalked the hinterland of the Sunshine Coast, Queensland since early in the 19th century. These claims have been met with skepticism.

Tantanoola Tiger
The region around Tantanoola, a town in the southeast of South Australia was supposed to have been the stalking ground of the Tantanoola Tiger during the late 19th century. On 25 August 1895 an animal believed to be the Tantanoola Tiger was shot by Tom Donovian and identified as an Assyrian wolf; although no such species appears to exist. It was stuffed and remains on display in the Tantanoola Hotel.

China
The blue, or Maltese, tiger, the former name taken from the common color terminology for domestic cats, is a purported color morph of the South China tiger, with sightings in Myanmar, China and the Korean Peninsula. It is speculated that, if the "blue" genotype ever existed, it is now extinct due to poaching for traditional Chinese medicine.

Denmark
In 1995, a big cat usually described as a lion (but sometimes as a lynx) was dubbed the "Beast of Funen" by numerous eyewitnesses. There was an earlier big cat sighting from 1982 in southern Jutland.

Finland
A supposed lion moved around Ruokolahti near the Finnish-Russian border in June–August 1992. There were multiple sightings. Tracks were identified by a government biologist as a big feline not native to Finland. The biologist was given police powers to capture or shoot the lion by the Ministry of the Interior. Border guards participated in the hunt. The last reported sightings were in Russia and there were reports that the lion was seen by Finnish border guards and that lion tracks were found in the raked sand field used by Russian border guards to detect crossings. The lion was never captured and the incidents have never been explained. One possible explanation could have been a railway accident of a circus train in Russia, where some of the animals escaped.

Great Britain

Since the 1960s, there have been many alleged sightings of big cats across Great Britain. A 15-month survey conducted in 2003–04 by the British Big Cats Society gave the following regional breakdown, based on 2,052 sightings: South West 21%, South East 16%, East Anglia 12%, Scotland 11% and West Midlands 9%. Since 1903, a number of exotic cats, all of which are thought to have escaped from captivity, have been killed or captured.

India

The Pogeyan is a large grey feline known to local people living in the Western Ghats, India. Its name is derived from the local dialect, and means "The cat that comes and goes like the mist."

Luxembourg
In 2009, a black panther was allegedly spotted in the industrial area of Bommelscheuer near Bascharage. When police came, the panther was gone. In the following couple of days, the panther was spotted all over the country. For a while it was alleged that a panther had escaped a nearby zoo (Amnéville), but the zoo later denied that any panther was missing. A couple of days after the Bascharage incident, it also was mentioned that although the police did not find a panther, they did find an unusually large house cat.

The Netherlands
In 2005, a black cougar was allegedly spotted on several occasions in a wildlife preserve, but the animal, nicknamed Winnie, was later identified as an unusually large crossbreed between a domestic cat and a wildcat.

New Zealand

Since the late 1990s, big cat sightings have been reported in widely separated parts of New Zealand, in both the North and South Islands.  There have been several unverified panther sightings in Mid-Canterbury near Ashburton and in the nearby foothills of the Southern Alps / Kā Tiritiri o te Moana, but searches conducted there in 2003 by the Ministry of Agriculture and Forestry found no corroborating physical evidence.

United States
Phantom cat sightings in the United States should not be confused with sightings of jaguars in their native range in the states of Arizona and New Mexico (while early records of North American jaguars show much wider distribution as far as Monterey) or cougars being sighted recolonizing the extirpated eastern cougar's former range in the Northeastern United States and expanding their range eastward.

Connecticut

In 1939, a panther-like creature called the Glawackus was sighted in Glastonbury, Connecticut. It became a national sensation, and sporadic sightings of it across Connecticut continued into the 1960s.

Delaware
There have been reported sightings of what is believed to be a mountain lion in the northern Delaware forests since the late 1990s. The Delaware Division of Fish and Wildlife believes there may be more than one mountain lion in Delaware and that they originate from animals released from captivity.

Hawaii
In December 2002, sightings of a big cat increased in numbers in the Kula (upcountry) area, and the Division of Forestry and Wildlife requested the help of big cat wildlife biologists William van Pelt and Stan Cunningham of the Arizona Game and Fish Department. Van Pelt and Cunningham believed that the cat was probably a large feline, such as a leopard, jaguar, or cougar. It may have been illegally brought into Hawaii as a pet and released or allowed to wander in the wild. No big cat was detected by traps, infrared cameras, or professional trackers. A fur sample was obtained in 2003, but DNA analysis was inconclusive. The state's hunt for the cat was suspended in late November 2003, after three weeks without sightings. Utah State University professor and wildlife biologist Robert Schmidt expressed strong doubts about the cat's existence, likening it to the Loch Ness monster.

Illinois
In the Shawnee National Forest of Alexander County, there have been encounters of large black panthers reported sporadically since the 1860s.

Massachusetts
MassWildlife has confirmed two cases of a mountain lion's presence in Massachusetts. There have been numerous other reports of sightings, as well as alleged photographs, but these remain unconfirmed by state wildlife officials.

North Carolina
Black panthers and other large "non-indigenous" cats have been sighted for many years in the vicinity of Oriental, North Carolina. Accounts from locals and visitors alike have been documented in the local papers.

See also
Introduced species
Phantom kangaroo
Winged cat

References

External links
 Australian Big Cats
 British Big Cats Society

Mythological felines